Ingrid Bodsch (born 22 January 1953) is an Austrian historian and faculty at the .

Biography
She completed a Master of Arts there in 1977. From 1977 to 1981, Bodsch was a research associate at the University of Bonn for professors  and Eugen Ewig. From 1981 to 1985, Bodsch was an assistant researcher at the Schnütgen Museum in Colgone under .

Bodsch married molecular biologist Wolfram Bodsch in 1977 and accompanied him on his research trips to the United States, where she would find herself working at the Getty Museum from 1986 to 1988 and the Metropolitan Museum of Art.

Bodsch completed her doctorate in 1988 at the University of Bonn, and was then commissioned to plan and execute the 2000th anniversary of the founding of Jülich.

In 2010, she coordinated the Schumann Year Celebrations to commemorate Robert Schumann's 200th birthday.

External links
 Literature by and about Ingrid Bodsch in the catalog of the German National Library
 Literature by and about Ingrid Bodsch in the database of WorldCat

Citations

Living people
1953 births
Writers from Graz
Austrian medievalists
Women medievalists
Directors of museums in Germany
Women museum directors
Recipients of the Austrian Decoration for Science and Art
Recipients of the Decoration for Services to the Republic of Austria